Charlie Ward Jr. (born October 12, 1970) is a former American professional basketball player. Ward was an exceptional football player as well, winning the Heisman Trophy, Davey O'Brien Award, and College Football National Championship while quarterbacking the Florida State Seminoles. Despite his college football success, he was not drafted to the NFL, opting instead to play in the National Basketball Association (NBA).

Ward played for nine years with the New York Knicks and started in the 1999 NBA Finals. He later had short spells with the San Antonio Spurs and Houston Rockets, before retiring in 2005. He was inducted into the College Football Hall of Fame in 2006.

College football 

Ward won the 1993 Heisman Trophy, Maxwell Award, and Davey O'Brien Award as a quarterback for The Florida State University, and subsequently led the Seminoles to their first-ever National Championship when FSU defeated Nebraska 18–16 in the 1993 Orange Bowl. The Seminoles had suffered their only defeat of the season to a second-ranked Notre Dame team, but their path to the National Championship was cleared a week later when the Irish were upset at home by Boston College. Ward holds the fourth-largest margin of victory in the history of Heisman trophy balloting, with a 1,622-point difference, fourth only to Joe Burrow's 1,846 point win in 2019, O. J. Simpson's 1,750-point win in 1968 and Troy Smith's 1,662-point win in 2006. He was also the only Heisman winner to play in the NBA. In 1993, Charlie Ward won the James E. Sullivan Award from the Amateur Athletic Union (AAU) as the most outstanding amateur athlete in the United States.

College basketball 
Ward also played basketball for four years at The Florida State University (FSU). Former teammates included future NBA players Bob Sura, Doug Edwards, and Sam Cassell. His 1993 team made it to the Southeast Regional Final where they lost to Kentucky 106–81 with the winner advancing to the Final Four. Ward's 1992 team made the Sweet Sixteen. He made the game-winning shot in its Metro Conference Tournament Championship game win over Louisville in 1991. Ward still holds FSU basketball records for career steals at 236 and steals in one game at 9, and ranks sixth all-time in assists at 396. He played a shortened season his senior year, joining the basketball team just 15 days after winning the Heisman Trophy. He started 16 games at the point guard position that year, and averaged a college career high of 10.5 points and 4.9 assists for the season.

|-
| style="text-align:left;"| 1990–91
| style="text-align:left;"| Florida State
| 30 || — || 23.8 || .455 || .313 || .713 || 3.0|| 3.4 || 2.4 || .3 || 8.0
|-
| style="text-align:left;"| 1991–92
| style="text-align:left;"| Florida State
| 28 || 22 || 30.0 || .497 || .458 || .530 || 3.2 || 4.4 || 2.7 || .2 || 7.2
|-
| style="text-align:left;"| 1992–93
| style="text-align:left;"| Florida State
| 17 || 14 || 32.8 || .462 || .320 || .667 || 2.6 || 5.5 || 2.8 || .3 || 7.8
|-
| style="text-align:left;"| 1993–94
| style="text-align:left;"| Florida State
| 16 || 16 || 35.9 || .365 || .253 || .625 || 3.9 || 4.9 || 2.8 || .1 || 10.5
|-
|- class="sortbottom"
| style="text-align:center;" colspan="2"| Career
| 91 || 52 || 29.5 || .441 || .323 || .636 || 3.1 || 4.4 || 2.6 || .2 || 8.1

Professional career
Upon graduation, Ward stated he was undecided about professional basketball or football and made it clear that he would not consider playing in the NFL unless selected in the first round of the 1994 NFL Draft. Ward proclaimed that he "deserved to" be a first-rounder. Ward's mother reported that the family was told he "was probably a third- to fifth-round pick." Due to his smaller stature and uncertainty about whether he would play in the NBA, Ward was not selected in the first round of the NFL Draft. Having been chosen in the 1st round (26th overall) of the 1994 NBA Draft by the New York Knicks, he began his career in the NBA as a point guard. An inquiry was made during Ward's rookie year with the Knicks for him to become the backup quarterback for Joe Montana of the Kansas City Chiefs, but Ward declined. Ward is the only Heisman Trophy winner to play in the NBA, and besides Bo Jackson (MLB), the only winner of that award to play professionally in another Big 4 league.

Ward played sparingly in his rookie year under head coach Pat Riley, but the Knicks organization referred to him as "the point guard of the future." When assistant coach Jeff Van Gundy took over the head coaching position, Ward's time on the floor began to increase, becoming the primary backup for point guard Derek Harper. He became a fan favorite in New York for his hard work ethic and unselfish play. During his NBA career, Ward established himself as a good three-point shooter, a reliable ball distributor, and a respected floor leader. Ward was selected to participate in the 1998 NBA All-Star three-point competition, finishing fourth in the event. He soon helped the Knicks reach the 1999 NBA Finals before falling to the San Antonio Spurs. Ward was traded to the Phoenix Suns in February 2004 as part of the blockbuster trade that brought Stephon Marbury to the Knicks and was promptly cut by the Suns for salary purposes. Ward spent the remainder of the season with the Spurs and signed a contract with the Houston Rockets the following summer.  After maintaining relatively good health over his first decade in the league, injuries caused Ward to miss most of the 2004–05 season. Because of his injuries Ward retired.

During his time with the Knicks, Ward was often called the "best quarterback in New York" due to the struggles that the New York Jets and New York Giants had at the position. Dubiously, Ward was the last Knicks draft pick to sign a multiyear contract with the team after the expiration of their rookie deal expired for 23 years.

Off the court, Ward became known for his extensive charitable work through groups like the Fellowship of Christian Athletes. In 2011, at the NCAA Final Four, Ward received the John Wooden Keys to Life award given for continued excellence and integrity on and off the court.

Ward established The aWard Foundation to enhance the lives of young people through sports based mentoring and educational programs.

Controversy
In Game 5 of the 1997 Eastern Conference Semifinals against the Miami Heat, with the Knicks holding a 3–1 series lead, Ward tried to box out P. J. Brown. When he tried to get inside after the free throw shot, Brown became frustrated, then retaliated by lifting Ward up and body-slamming him. This caused a bench-clearing brawl to ensue. After Miami won the game 96–81, Patrick Ewing, John Starks, Larry Johnson, Allan Houston, and Ward himself, were suspended by the NBA. Ewing, Houston, Johnson, and Starks left the bench during the brawl, which was mandatory cause for suspension according to NBA rules. Brown was suspended for the rest of the series; Ewing, Ward and Houston were suspended for Game 6, and Johnson and Starks were suspended for Game 7. Due to the suspensions, the Knicks were shorthanded and lost Games 6 and 7 to Miami 95–90 and 101–90, respectively, failing to advance to the Eastern Conference Finals. Miami would go on to lose to the Chicago Bulls in five games.

In 2001, while playing for the Knicks, it was discovered that Ward had made comments about Jews during a Bible-study session, comments that were eventually leaked to the press. Among the comments made: "Jews are stubborn...tell me, why did they persecute Jesus unless He knew something they didn't want to accept...They had His blood on their hands."

There was outrage directed at Ward from Jewish groups, the public, as well as the Knicks organization itself. Ward defended himself by saying "I didn't mean to offend any one group because that's not what I'm about. I have friends that are Jewish. Actually, my friend is a Jewish guy, and his name is Jesus Christ." He also said the quotes were taken out of context, as he stated that "Jews are stubborn" in speaking to what he perceived to be their disinclination to convert to Christianity.

Ward eventually apologized for those statements, with his apology being accepted by the Anti-Defamation League.

Career statistics

NBA

|-
| style="text-align:left;"| 
| style="text-align;left;"| New York
|10	||0	||4.4	||.211	||.100	||.700	||.6	||.4	||.2	||.0	||1.6
|-
| style="text-align:left;"| 
| style="text-align;left;"| New York
|62	||1	||12.7	||.399	||.333	||.685	||1.6	||2.1	||.9	||.1	||3.9
|-
| style="text-align:left;"| 
| style="text-align;left;"| New York
|79	||21	||22.3	||.395	||.312	||.76	||2.8	||4.1	||1.1	||.2	||5.2
|-
| style="text-align:left;"| 
| style="text-align;left;"| New York
|82	||82	||28.3	||.455	||.377	||.805	||3.3	||5.7	||1.8	||.5	||7.8
|-
| style="text-align:left;"| 
| style="text-align;left;"| New York
|50	||50	||31.1	||.404	||.356	||.705	||3.4	||5.4	||2.1	||.2	||7.6
|-
| style="text-align:left;"| 1999–00
| style="text-align;left;"| New York
|72	||69	||27.6	||.423	||.386	||.828	||3.2	||4.2	||1.3	||.2	||7.3
|-
| style="text-align:left;"| 
| style="text-align;left;"| New York
|61	||33	||24.5	||.416	||.383	||.800	||2.6	||4.5	||1.1	||.2	||7.1
|-
| style="text-align:left;"| 
| style="text-align;left;"| New York
|63	||0	||16.8	||.373	||.323	||.810	||2.0	||3.2	||1.1	||.2	||5.2
|-
| style="text-align:left;"| 
| style="text-align;left;"| New York
|66	||6	||22.2	||.399	||.378	||.774	||2.7	||4.6	||1.2	||.2	||7.2
|-
| style="text-align:left;"| 
| style="text-align;left;"| New York
|35	||10	||23.6	||.442	||.428	||.762	||2.7	||4.9	||1.3	||.2	||8.7
|-
| style="text-align:left;"| 
| style="text-align;left;"| San Antonio
|36	||0	||11.8	||.346	||.368	||.667	||1.3	||1.3	||.5	||.1	||3.3
|-
| style="text-align:left;"| 
| style="text-align;left;"| Houston
|14	||13	||25.7	||.312	||.314	||.846	||2.8	||3.1	||1.1	||.0	||5.4
|- class="sortbottom"
| style="text-align:center;" colspan="2"| Career
|630	||285	||22.3	||.408	||.364	||.771	||2.6	||4.0	||1.2	||.2	||6.3

|-
| style="text-align:left;"| 1996
| style="text-align;left;"| New York
|7	||0	||13.1	||.481	||.250	||.429	||1.3	||2.4	||1.6	||.0	||4.6
|-
| style="text-align:left;"| 1997
| style="text-align;left;"| New York
|9	||0	||20.2	||.296	||.111	||.750	||2.8	||4.3	||1.4	||.0	||2.2
|-
| style="text-align:left;"| 1998
| style="text-align;left;"| New York
|10	||10	||26.1	||.418	||.429	||.688	||2.8	||6.0 ||2.0 ||.2 ||6.6
|-
| style="text-align:left;"| 1999
| style="text-align;left;"| New York
|20	||20	||24.7	||.366	||.321	||.750	||2.3	||3.8	||1.8	||.2	||4.6
|-
| style="text-align:left;"| 2000
| style="text-align;left;"| New York
|16	||16	||27.4	||.504	||.396	||.714	||4.3	||4.1	||1.4	||.3 ||9.4
|-
| style="text-align:left;"| 2001
| style="text-align;left;"| New York
|5	||0	||17.2	||.296	||.250	||1.000	||1.4	||1.4	||.4	||.0	||5.0
|-
| style="text-align:left;"| 2004
| style="text-align;left;"| San Antonio
|5	||0	||2.6	||.667	||1.000	||–	||.0	||.2	||.4	||.0	||2.2
|- class="sortbottom"
| style="text-align:center;" colspan="2"| Career
|72	||46 ||21.8	||.422||.349||.710||2.5||3.7||1.5'||.1||5.5

Personal life
Ward is a member of Omega Psi Phi fraternity. He and his wife Tonja have three children: Caleb, Hope, and Joshua In June 2007, Ward was hired as an assistant coach for the varsity boys basketball team by Westbury Christian School in Houston, Texas, having passed on many professional sports opportunities. He was previously an assistant coach for the Houston Rockets. In addition, in November 2007, he accepted the job as head coach for the varsity football team at Westbury Christian School, stating that his desire is to help prepare young minds for Christ. In February 2014, it was announced that Ward accepted the head coaching position at Booker T. Washington High School in Pensacola, Florida, where his son Caleb would be attending and playing football. As of March 8, 2018, Charlie is the Ambassador of Football for Florida State University. In March 2018, Ward became the head Boys' Basketball coach for Florida State University Schools (FSUS or Florida High) in Tallahassee, Florida. Currently Florida High's Boys Basketball program has improved since Ward's arrival. Charlie is also the host of a web series, Chalk Talk with Charlie Ward, where he discusses his thoughts on Florida State Seminole Football.

In June 2018, while on a church mission trip to Ensenada, Mexico, Ward suffered a stroke. He has since made a full recovery. Ward switched to a vegan diet and began a more consistent workout regimen to improve his health and prevent another stroke in the future.

Acting career
Charlie Ward made his acting debut on the Netflix comedy series Family Reunion episode "Remember M'dear's Fifteen Minutes?" playing himself in 2020.

References

External links
 
 

1970 births
Living people
African-American basketball coaches
African-American basketball players
African-American Christians
African-American coaches of American football
African-American players of American football
All-American college football players
American football punters
American football quarterbacks
American men's basketball coaches
American men's basketball players
Basketball coaches from Georgia (U.S. state)
Basketball players from Georgia (U.S. state)
Basketball players from Houston
Coaches of American football from Georgia (U.S. state)
College Football Hall of Fame inductees
Florida State Seminoles football players
Florida State Seminoles men's basketball players
Heisman Trophy winners
High school basketball coaches in Texas
High school football coaches in Texas
Houston Rockets assistant coaches
Houston Rockets players
James E. Sullivan Award recipients
Maxwell Award winners
New York Knicks draft picks
New York Knicks players
People from Thomasville, Georgia
Players of American football from Georgia (U.S. state)
Players of American football from Houston
Point guards
San Antonio Spurs players